Ore-Ida is an American brand of potato-based frozen foods currently produced and distributed by Kraft Heinz's, H.J. Heinz Company Brands LLC. based in Pittsburgh, Pennsylvania.

Ore-Ida's primary production facility is located in Ontario, Oregon near the Idaho border where the company was originally founded in 1949. It once employed over 1,000 local residents, and currently has about 650 employees.  It is generally considered a leading potato brand in the American market, consistently accounting for a large amount of processed potatoes sold.

History

In 1934, Mormon entrepreneurs Francis Nephi Grigg and Golden Grigg began growing sweet corn in eastern Oregon. Their first company, "Grigg Brothers", became the largest distributor of sweet corn in the United States. In 1949, with financial backing from their brother-in-law Otis Williams, the brothers rented a frozen food plant located in Ontario, at the border with Idaho, and converted it into a potato-processing facility. The three purchased the facility around 1952 after the plant went into foreclosure. The company was officially founded that year as the "Oregon Frozen Foods Company".

The company initially produced and sold frozen corn and French fries. In 1953, Nephi, Golden, Otis, and Ross developed Tater Tots, bite-sized "logs" formed from seasoned slivers of potatoes, which were leftovers from French fry production. Tater Tots are today considered the brand's most well known product.

In 1960, the company built a second plant in Burley, Idaho, where some of their potato fields were located. The company's name is a syllabic abbreviation of the first few letters of Oregon and Idaho and the original logo consisted of the outlines of Oregon and Idaho with Ore-Ida superimposed in italicized letters.

After going public in 1961, the Ore-Ida brand was acquired by the H. J. Heinz Company in 1965. The Heinz company coined Ore-Ida's long time advertising slogan: “When it says Ore-Ida, it’s All Righta.”

McCain Foods purchased Ore-Ida's foodservice division in 1997, acquiring five of the company's plants, including the Burley location. Ore-Ida's division headquarters were located in Boise until 1999, when a new frozen foods division was created based at Heinz's corporate headquarters in Pittsburgh, Pennsylvania.

Sports sponsorship 
 Ore-Ida Women's Challenge road cycling race in the 1980s and 1990s.
 In 2005 and 2006, Ore-Ida sponsored Brian Vickers' #57 Chevrolet in the NASCAR Busch Series. In 2007, Ore-Ida/Heinz and Delimex foods (another Heinz brand) sponsored the #21 Wood Brothers Racing Ford for selected NASCAR NEXTEL Cup events, driven by Jon Wood and Bill Elliott.

See also
 List of frozen food brands

References

External links 
 

Heinz brands
Food manufacturers of the United States
Frozen food brands
Ontario, Oregon
Food and drink companies established in 1952
1952 establishments in Oregon
Companies based in Pittsburgh